was a bureaucrat and cabinet minister in early Shōwa period Japan.

Biography
Tanabe was born in what is now Kōshū, Yamanashi as the younger son of a local  sake  brewer. He graduated from the law school of Tokyo Imperial University in 1905 and received a posting to the Ministry of Communications. He was subsequently sent to France for studies, and returned as an expert in wireless communications. Tanabe rose through the ranks within the ministry, becoming Bureau Chief in 1924.

Tanabe was drawn into politics over the debate for constitutional revision at the time of the Kiyoura administration, and denounced the privileged position of the bureaucracy.  He resigned from his post at the time of the Katō administration.

However, conservative Minister of Justice and President of the House of Peers, Kiichirō Hiranuma thought very highly of Tanabe, and invited him to accept a position on the board of his Kokuhonsha, a nationalist political group founded in 1924. Tanabe became Hiranuma’s protégé and assistant. In 1927, he was appointed Governor of Osaka by Home Minister Suzuki Kisaburō, another Hiranuma protégé and Kokuhonsha member. However, he was forced to resign after a year when Suzuki was indicted on suspicion of electoral irregularities.

In 1933, Tanabe relocated to Manchukuo, where he served as vice-chairman to the Privy Council of the Empire of Manchukuo. He supported the viewpoint of the Kwangtung Army that private management of industries was more realistic than a completely state-controlled economy.  He was recalled to Japan with the formation of the Hiranuma administration, and after serving for a brief period as Chief Cabinet Secretary from January to April 1939, he was appointed Minister of Communications, serving in that post from April through the end of August 1939.

In 1938, Tanabe was appointed to a seat in the Upper House of the Diet of Japan. In 1941, he succeeded his mentor Hiranuma in the post of Home Minister in the 3rd Konoe administration for a period of three months.

After World War II, Tanabe was purged by the American occupation authorities. He died of illness in 1950.

References
 Hall, John Whitney.  The Cambridge History of Modern Japan. Cambridge University Press (1988). 
 Hunter, Janet. A Concise Dictionary of Modern Japanese History.  University of California Press. (1984). 
 Yamamura, Kozo.  The Economic Emergency of Modern Japan . Cambridge University Press (1997). 
 Yagami, Kazuno.  Konoe Fumimaro and the Failure of Peace in Japan, 1937–1941. Mcfarland (2006). 
 Yang, Daqing. Technology of Empire: Telecommunications and Japanese Expansion in Asia. Harvard University Press (2010).

External links

Biography at National Diet Library

Notes

1877 births
1967 deaths
People from Yamanashi Prefecture
University of Tokyo alumni
Government ministers of Japan
Ministers of Home Affairs of Japan
Governors of Osaka
People of Manchukuo
Politicians from Yamanashi Prefecture